Aleksandr Kislitsyn (born 8 March 1986) is a Kazakhstani football defender.

Career
Born in Karaganda, Kislitsyn began playing football with the reserve team of local side FC Shakhter in 2004. He joined Shakhter's first team in 2006 at age 20, and would appear in more than 100 league matches during four seasons with Shakhter. In February 2011, Kislitsyn signed with FC Tobol.

In October 2014, Kislitsyn, along with Dmitri Khomich, Mikhail Bakayev, Zaurbek Pliyev and Samat Smakov, was banned from training with FC Kairat by the club. On 6 January 2015, Kislitsyn, along with Samat Smakov, moved to FC Irtysh Pavlodar.

On 30 September 2016, Kislitsyn had his contract with FC Okzhetpes terminated by mutual consent.

On 20 January 2019, Kislitsyn signed for Okzhetpes, before singing for Shakhter Karagandy on 8 February 2020.

International
Kislitsyn was called up for the Kazakhstan national football team for the first time in June 2008. He has made 14 appearances for the senior side since 2008.

References

External links

Profile at club website

1986 births
Living people
Kazakhstani footballers
Association football defenders
Kazakhstan international footballers
Sportspeople from Karaganda
FC Kairat players
FC Okzhetpes players
FC Shakhter Karagandy players
FC Tobol players
FC Zhetysu players
Kazakhstan Premier League players